State Highway 41 (SH 41)  is a New Zealand state highway in the central North Island that runs from Manunui, just south of Taumarunui on  to Turangi just north of the Desert Road.

Route 
From Taumarunui, SH 41 runs west through farmland, crossing the Whanganui River before entering bushland and climbing north-west onto the Central Plateau. Eventually the highway turns south-west and crosses the Manawatū-Whanganui/Waikato regional boundary. At Kuratau Junction, there is an intersection with SH 32, which continues north to Tokoroa. SH 41 turns south and runs above Lake Taupo, passing Omori and Kuratau. At Waihi Village, the road descends to the lake, and passes through Tokaanu, a hydrothermal village with hot springs.

See also
List of New Zealand state highways

References

External links
 New Zealand Transport Agency

41